Ghani is a 2022 Indian Telugu-language sports drama film written and directed by Kiran Korrapati and produced by Renaissance Pictures and Allu Bobby Company. The film stars Varun Tej as the title character alongside Saiee Manjrekar, Jagapathi Babu, Upendra, Suniel Shetty, Sukhjeevan Singh Dhillon, Naveen Chandra .

The film was scheduled to release on 25 February 2022 theatrically but postponed further. The film was released on 8 April 2022, and received overwhelmingly negative reviews from critics. Following the film's release, Tej acknowledged and apologised, accepting the film's failure at the box office through a note on social media.

Cast 

 Varun Tej as Ghani 
 Ronit Kamra as  young Ghani
 Saiee Manjrekar as Maya
 Jagapathi Babu as Eswarnath
 Upendra as Vikramaditya, Ghani's father
 Suniel Shetty as Vijender Sinha
 Naveen Chandra as Aadi
 Nadhiya as Madhuri, Ghani's mother
 Naresh as Ghani’s college coach
 Tanikella Bharani as Maya’s father
 Satya as Vijender's servant
 Raghu Babu as Eswarnath's assistant
 Bharat Reddy as Yusuf, Betting specialist
 Brahmaji as Sports federation member
 Hari Teja as Madhuri's maid
 Appaji Ambarisha Darbha as Boxing committee head
 Sukhjeevan Singh Dhillon as Ivan
 Ashu Reddy as Maya's friend
 Rajiv Kumar Aneja as a commentator
 Lahari Shari as a commentator
 Tamannaah in a special appearance in the item number "Kodthe"

Production 
The film's title was unveiled in January 2021. Tej was reported to play a boxer. He was trained under Tony Jeffries, the former England boxer who won a bronze at the 2008 Summer Olympics. The film is produced by Sidhu Mudda and Allu Bobby. S. Thaman is composing the music.

Upendra joined the production in February 2021. Filming took place in Hyderabad. A shooting schedule also took place at Visakhapatnam. Special sets were made for the boxing episodes of the film.

Music 

The film score and soundtrack album of the film is composed by S. Thaman. The first single from the soundtrack, "Ghani Anthem" was released on 27 October 2021. The music rights were acquired by Aditya Music.

Release 
Ghani was released on 8 April 2022. The film was originally scheduled to release on 30 July 2021, but was later postponed due to COVID-19 pandemic in India. In early-August 2021, the film's release was rescheduled to November 2021, coinciding with Deepavali. In October 2021, the release date was announced as 3 December 2021. Later, it was rescheduled to release on 24 December 2021. In the early-December, the makers postponed the release indefinitely to avoid clash with other films releasing the same month. In February 2022, it was announced by the makers that the film will release on 25 February 2022 or that the film was going to be postponed to 4 March 2022 depending upon the release of other films. The film was scheduled for a theatrical release on 25 February 2022 but was postponed due to Bheemla Nayak choosing to release on that day. The film will be finally releasing on 8th April 2022.

Non-theatrical rights including digital streaming and satellite rights of the film were acquired by Aha and Gemini TV respectively at a cost of  combined. Prior to the film's release, Telangana Today reported that the film premiere on Netflix, but the film was premiered on Aha on 22 April 2022.

Reception

Box office 
Ghani collected a distributor's share of  crore on its opening day.

Critical response 
The film received mixed to negative reviews from critics who severely panned the film. Neeshita Nyayapati of The Times of India rated the film 2.5 out of 5 stars and wrote "Ghani is a decent sports drama, but that’s all it ends up being – decent. The film doesn’t provide anything you haven’t seen before". A reviewer from Pinkvilla rated the film 2.5 out of 5 stars and wrote "The romantic track involving the hero and Saiee Manjrekar is inexcusably cliche-ridden.The negative characters make their cheapness obvious". A reviewer from Sakshi Post rated the film 2.5 out of 5 stars and wrote "Ghani is a decent sports drama". 

Sowmya Rajendran of The News Minute rated the film 2 out of 5 stars and stated "The film has nothing new to offer and is a half-baked sports drama full of déjà vu moments". Ram Venkat Srikar of The New Indian Express rated the film 1.5 out of 5 stars and wrote "Ghani fails to pack a punch. I know it’s a cliched verdict, but it’s still more inventive than the film". Sangeetha Devi Dundoo of The Hindu stated "A few masala moments stand out, but the sports and revenge drama is let down by insipid writing".

References

External links 
 

2020s Telugu-language films
2022 drama films
2022 films
Geetha Arts films
Indian boxing films
Indian sports drama films
Films scored by Thaman S
Films shot in Hyderabad, India
Films shot in Visakhapatnam
2020s sports drama films
Films postponed due to the COVID-19 pandemic
Film productions suspended due to the COVID-19 pandemic
Films set in Visakhapatnam